The Toliara Province (formerly Toliary or Tuléar) is a former province of Madagascar with an area of . It had a population of 2,229,550 (July, 2001). Its capital was Toliara. Near Toliara was the "spiny forest".

Toliara Province bordered the following provinces – Mahajanga Province in the north, Antananarivo Province in the northeast and Fianarantsoa Province in the east. Masikoro Malagasy and Tandroy Malagasy were the chief languages. Sea cucumbers were exported from the province and were an important factor in its economy. The deciduous Andronovory forest was located in the province.

The province was the poorest one in Madagascar. In 1993, 8 in every 10 person of the province was living below the poverty line. Despite the production of export crops the province recorded the highest rural poverty. The average fertility rate per woman was above 5. With 77 percent of its population being illiterate, Tolaira was the most illiterate province of Madagascar. Only 22 percent of the province's population had received primary level education.

The commercially valuable softwood tree Givotia madagascariensis, found in Antananarivo and Toliara provinces was endemic to Madagascar. The oil producing plant moringa drouhardii was endemic to Toliara province. Deforestation was a major issue for the province. In April 1971, a peasant rebellion was organised by MONIMA leader Monja Joana. The peasants refused to pay taxes and the government retaliated by dissolving MONIMA and deporting Joana.

Toliara province offered poor transport and security facilities. Potable water was accessible to only 24.9% of the province's households. It was rich in terms of minerals. Toliara province was in the news in July 2005 for its mining activity.

Abolition 

The provinces were abolished following the results of Malagasy constitutional referendum, 2007 which led to the formation of 22 smaller areas (faritra or regions) to facilitate regional development.

Administrative divisions 

Toliara Province was divided into four regions of Madagascar - Androy, Anosy, Atsimo Andrefana and Menabe. These four regions became the first-level administrative divisions when the provinces were abolished in 2009. They are sub-divided into 21 districts:

 Androy region:
 Ambovombe-Androy
 Bekily
 Beloha
 Tsiombe
 Anosy region:
 Amboasary Sud
 Betroka
 Taolanaro
 Atsimo-Andrefana region:
 Ampanihy Ouest
 Ankazoabo
 Benenitra
 Beroroha
 Betioky-Atsimo
 Morombe
 Sakaraha
 Toliara II
 Toliara
 Menabe region:
 Belon'i Tsiribihina
 Mahabo
 Manja
 Miandrivazo
 Morondava

References

Bibliography 

 
 
 
 
 
 
 
 
 
 
 

 
Provinces of Madagascar